Albino Alligator is a 1996 American crime thriller film. The directorial debut of Kevin Spacey as well as the screenwriting debut of Christian Forte, it stars Matt Dillon, Faye Dunaway, and Gary Sinise. It tells the story of three small-time criminals who take hostages after being cornered by the police. The title refers to an anecdote told in the film, claiming that alligators will use an albino among them as sacrifice, so that the opposing alligators will be distracted and become prey themselves.

Plot 
Brothers Dova (Matt Dillon) and Milo (Gary Sinise) are small-time crooks. They and their partner, Law (William Fichtner), pull a holdup in New Orleans that goes terribly wrong. A police officer is killed, as are two other men. The robbers flee to a local bar, Dino's Last Chance, desperately taking everyone inside hostage.

Milo is seriously wounded and bleeding. Law is a sociopath who is ready and willing to kill anyone who gets in his way. Dova is their leader, trying to keep the situation calm while federal agents, led by Browning (Joe Mantegna), surround the bar. A bar employee, Janet (Faye Dunaway), tries but fails to reason with the intruders. Her boss, Dino, behind the bar, secretly has a shotgun that he is hoping to get a chance to use. He does—grabbing Law and holding it on him, but Law gets the upper hand and bludgeons him. Besides a barfly (John Spencer) who is barely coherent and a younger man, Danny (Skeet Ulrich) shooting pool, there is one other customer (Viggo Mortensen), a man named Foucard dressed in a business suit, who is strangely silent and inactive all his time there. As the life of Milo slips away and the robbers' demands to the cops go unmet, Dova decides whether to surrender or start letting Law shoot hostages one at a time. Law is especially terrified of going back to prison. Dova and Law prepare to take Danny as a hostage. But Janet pleads with them not to as he is her son. It is revealed that Foucard is a wanted fugitive and the police really want him. Dova and Law prepare to give Foucard to the police and pretend that Foucard is the kidnapper and they are the hostages.

Milo has Dova and Law swear on their mothers that they will not kill anyone. But when painted into a corner, Law is more than ready to kill and Dova agrees. Milo wants no more of it all and prepares to turn himself in. Dova holds a gun on him to keep him there. When Dova and Law leave, Milo takes the knife he was given from a hostage and uses it to cut his wrists, committing suicide. Dova finds out and is in tears. They prepare to give the police the wanted Foucard. The police finally storm the place and open fire killing both Law and Foucard. Dova and the real hostages are allowed to vacate the bar. Janet covers for Dova, as he kept Law from killing the rest of the hostages. Dova is traumatized.

Cast 
 Matt Dillon as Dova
 Faye Dunaway as Janet Boudreaux
 Gary Sinise as Milo
 William Fichtner as Law
 Viggo Mortensen as Guy Foucard
 John Spencer as Jack
 Skeet Ulrich as Danny Boudreaux
 Frankie Faison as ATF Agent Marv Rose
 Melinda McGraw as Jenny Ferguson
 Joe Mantegna as A.T.F. Agent G.D. Browning
 M. Emmet Walsh as Dino
 Jeff Hoffman as Jenny's Cameraman

Reception

Critical response 

Reviews for the film were generally mixed. It maintains a 50% "rotten" rating on Rotten Tomatoes based on 20 reviews.

Accolades 
Faye Dunaway was nominated for a Golden Raspberry Award as Worst Supporting Actress.

Soundtrack 

Ambient guitarist and record producer Michael Brook produced the score for Albino Alligator. The soundtrack was released by 4AD on CD in the United States on 11 February 1997, and CD and vinyl LP in the United Kingdom on 24 February 1997. The score includes a cover of "Ill Wind (You're Blowing Me No Good)" featuring bass by Flea and guest vocals from R.E.M.'s Michael Stipe and jazz singer Jimmy Scott.

Track listing

References

External links 

 
 
 

1996 films
1996 crime drama films
1996 crime thriller films
1996 independent films
American crime drama films
American independent films
Films scored by Michael Brook
Films directed by Kevin Spacey
Films set in New Orleans
Films shot in New Orleans
Films about hostage takings
American neo-noir films
1996 directorial debut films
1990s English-language films
1990s American films